Laila Mohsen (born 22 August 2000) is an Egyptian synchronized swimmer. She competed in the 2020 Summer Olympics.

References

2000 births
Living people
Egyptian synchronized swimmers
Synchronized swimmers at the 2020 Summer Olympics
Olympic synchronized swimmers of Egypt